The Macedonian Greek Catholic Church, sometimes called, in reference to its Byzantine Rite, the Macedonian Byzantine Catholic Church is sui juris Eastern Catholic church in full union with the Catholic Church which uses the Macedonian language in the liturgy. The Macedonian Greek Catholic Church comprises a single eparchy, the Macedonian Catholic Eparchy of the Assumption of the Blessed Virgin Mary in Strumica-Skopje.

History
An Apostolic Exarch was appointed for Bulgarian Catholic Apostolic Vicariate of Macedonia as early as 1883 and lasting until 1922/1924 as part of the Bulgarian Greek Catholic Church. After the end of World War I and the foundation of Yugoslavia, the Exarchate was absorbed into the Eparchy of Križevci.

In January 2001, a separate Greek Catholic Apostolic Exarchate of Macedonia was formed for Eastern Catholics of the Byzantine Rite in North Macedonia. It was separated from the Eparchy of Križevci and constituted as directly subject to the Holy See. On the same day (11 January 2001) the Holy See appointed the Latin Bishop of Skopje as the first Apostolic Exarch of North Macedonia.

Statistics
, the Church's membership was estimated at approximately 11,374 faithful, with one bishop, 8 parishes, 16 priests, and 18 religious sisters.

List of Hierarchs

Apostolic Exarchs
Lazar Mladenov (1883–1895), Titular Bishop of Satala 
Epiphany Shanov (1895–1922 or 1924), Titular Bishop of Livias
Joakim Herbut (2001–2005), Latin Church Bishop of Skopje
Kiro Stojanov (2005–2018), Latin Church Bishop of Skopje

Eparchs of Strumica
Kiro Stojanov (2018–present), Latin Church Bishop of Skopje

See also

 Catholic Church in North Macedonia

References

External links
Eparchy of Križevci 
Apostolic Exarchate of Macedonia (2001- ) on Catholic Hierarchy
Article on Greek Catholics in Former Yugoslavia by Ronald Roberson on the CNEWA website